Finn Axel Pratt  (born 1960) is a retired senior Australian public servant. He was most recently Secretary of the Department of the Environment and Energy.

Life and career
Pratt has a Bachelor of Arts from the Australian National University.

He was appointed Chief Executive Officer of Centrelink in September 2008. Finn Pratt was promoted to the role of Secretary of the Department of Human Services in 2009.

In 2011, Pratt moved into the position of Secretary of the Department of Families, Housing, Community Services and Indigenous Affairs.

In 2013 he was appointed Secretary of the Department of Social Services. 

On 7 September 2017, the Prime Minister Malcolm Turnbull announced Pratt's appointment as Secretary of the Department of the Environment and Energy, commencing 18 September [4].

Pratt retired from office on 11 October 2019 following a 36 year career in the Australian Public Service. 

Pratt was the most senior public servant to appear before the Royal Commission into the Robodebt Scheme.  His evidence included:
 that he signed a letter to the Ombudsman saying his department was satisfied it was operating legally because he "trusted" the advice his officials provided
 that Robodebt scheme was "one headache which wasn't my headache" (even though he was the head of the policy department responsible, including signing said letter to the Ombudsman)
 that he did not believe he had asked how the scheme worked.

Awards
Pratt was awarded a Public Service Medal in January 2008 for outstanding public service in the development and implementation of significant and innovative reforms to public employment services and workplace relations in Australia. In June 2015, Pratt was appointed an Officer of the Order of Australia for his work on the National Disability Insurance Scheme.

References

Living people
1960s births
Place of birth missing (living people)
Australian public servants
Officers of the Order of Australia
Recipients of the Public Service Medal (Australia)
Australian National University alumni